Juan Rojas may refer to:

 Juan Rojas (bishop) (died 1578)
 Juan Rojas (footballer, born 1935), Chilean footballer
 Juan Rojas (Paraguayan footballer) (born 1945)
 Juan Rojas (footballer, born 1957), Chilean footballer
 Juan Rodrigo Rojas (born 1988), Paraguayan footballer

See also 
Rojas
Estadio Municipal Juan Rojas
Rojas (disambiguation)